Kumon is an educational network and a teaching method created by the Japanese educator Toru Kumon (1914–1995). It may also refer to
Kumon Leysin Academy of Switzerland, an associated school
Hiroaki Kumon (born 1966), Japanese football player
Katsuhiko Kumon (born 1992), Japanese baseball player

See also
Camon (disambiguation)
Kamon (disambiguation)

Japanese-language surnames